António Júlio da Costa Pereira de Eça GCIC (Lisbon, 31 March 1852 — 6 November 1917) - commonly known as Pereira d'Eça - was a general of the Portuguese Army, a colonial administrator colonial and minister of War (1914-1915).

References

1852 births
1917 deaths
Portuguese generals
Portuguese colonial governors and administrators
Portuguese military personnel of World War I
People from Lisbon